A total solar eclipse occurred on August 21, 1914. A solar eclipse occurs when the Moon passes between Earth and the Sun, thereby totally or partly obscuring the image of the Sun for a viewer on Earth. A total solar eclipse occurs when the Moon's apparent diameter is larger than the Sun's, blocking all direct sunlight, turning day into darkness. Totality occurs in a narrow path across Earth's surface, with the partial solar eclipse visible over a surrounding region thousands of kilometres wide.
The totality of this eclipse was visible from northern Canada, Greenland, Norway, Sweden, Russian Empire (the parts now belonging to Åland, Finland, Estonia, Latvia, Lithuania, Belarus, Ukraine and Russia, including cities of Riga, Minsk, Kiev and northeastern part of Vilnius), Ottoman Empire (the parts now belonging to Turkey, northeastern tip of Syria and northern Iraq), Persia and British Raj (the parts now belonging to Pakistan and western tip of India).
It was the first of four total solar eclipses that would be seen from Sweden during the next 40 years. This total solar eclipse occurred in the same calendar date as 2017, but at the opposite node. The moon was just 2.7 days before perigee, making it fairly large.

A number of observatories sent expeditions to Russia to observe the eclipse including those from Argentina, the United Kingdom, Germany, Russia, and the United States.  The expeditions led by Charles Dillon Perrine of the Argentine National Observatory, Erwin Finlay-Freundlich of the Berlin-Babelsberg Observatory, Germany, and William W. Campbell of the Lick Observatory, California, included in their programs the second attempt to verify the general relativity theory of Albert Einstein. (Perrine had made the first attempt at the 1912 solar eclipse in Brazil.) However, World War I broke out and Freundlich and his equipment were interned in Russia, unable to carry out the necessary measurements. C. D. Perrine and W. W. Campbell, from neutral countries, Argentina and the United States, were permitted to continue with their plans, but clouds obscured the eclipse. Perrine was able to obtain one photograph of the eclipse but the thin cloud cover was enough to obscure star locations necessary to test Einstein's theory.

Related eclipses

Solar eclipses of 1913–1917

Saros 124

Tritos series

References 

 Solar eclipse of August 21, 1914 in Russia (Russian)

1914 08 21
1914 in science
1914 08 21
August 1914 events